The 1838 West Suffolk by-election was held on 7 May 1838 after the death of the incumbent Conservative MP, Robert Hart Logan.  It was retained by the Conservative candidate Harry Spencer Waddington, who was unopposed despite an attempt by local Radicals to find a candidate.

References

West
Unopposed by-elections to the Parliament of the United Kingdom in English constituencies
1838 in England
1838 elections in the United Kingdom
May 1838 events